KELO-TV (channel 11) is a television station in Sioux Falls, South Dakota, United States, affiliated with CBS and MyNetworkTV. The station is owned by Nexstar Media Group, and maintains studios on Phillips Avenue in downtown Sioux Falls; its transmitter is located near Rowena, South Dakota.

KELO-TV serves the largest viewing area of any station in the United States, covering all of South Dakota as well as parts of Iowa, Minnesota, Montana, Nebraska, North Dakota and Wyoming. It calls its coverage area "KELOLAND" (with "KELO" pronounced to rhyme with "hello"). To cover this vast and mostly rural area, it utilizes a network of three full-power semi-satellites–KDLO-TV in Florence (channel 3, serving Watertown), KPLO-TV in Reliance (channel 6, serving Pierre), and KCLO-TV in Rapid City (channel 15). Together, these four stations are known as the KELOLAND Media Group (originally known as "KELO-land TV" from 1954 to 1991, and then as the "KELOLAND Television [Network]" thereafter until February 2020).

History
KELO-TV signed on air on May 19, 1953, as South Dakota's first television station. It was owned by Midcontinent Media, a theater and broadcasting conglomerate, along with KELO radio (AM 1320 and 92.5 FM). It was a primary NBC affiliate, but it also carried programs from ABC, CBS and DuMont. After KSOO-TV (now KSFY-TV) signed on in 1960, KELO-TV switched its primary affiliation to CBS and has remained with that network ever since.

Shortly after KELO-TV signed on, the Federal Communications Commission (FCC) collapsed eastern South Dakota, southwestern Minnesota and northwest Iowa into one giant television market. Later in the 1950s, Midcontinent began signing on satellite stations of KELO-TV to serve its vast coverage area. The first of these satellite stations, KDLO-TV, signed on for the first time on September 27, 1955 to serve Watertown and northeastern South Dakota. It was originally licensed to Garden City, but the license was later moved to the transmitter location at Florence. KPLO-TV, licensed to Reliance and serving South Dakota's state capital of Pierre, followed on July 15, 1957.

KELO-TV expanded to western South Dakota in 1981, when it signed on K15AC (channel 15), a translator of KPLO-TV, to serve Rapid City. On November 28, 1988, it was upgraded to a full-powered semi-satellite as KCLO-TV. Rapid City had been one of the few areas of the country without full service from the three major networks.

KELO was home to Captain 11, a popular children's show in the area, from 1955 until 1996. Captain 11 was Dave Dedrick, the station's longtime weatherman. He had been a popular radio personality before KELO went on air.

Channel 11 originally broadcast from a  tower near Shindler, South Dakota. On September 20, 1955, it was destroyed in a severe windstorm—believed to be a tornado. Station engineers had the station back on the air in 48 hours—just in time for the World Series. In 1956, the station erected a  tower on the same site, expanding its coverage area to most of eastern South Dakota. In 1967, KELO-TV moved to a new  tower near Rowena, shared with KSFY. The Shindler tower is still used as a backup.

On June 24, 1968, a North Central airliner clipped a guy wire on the year-old Rowena tower, bringing it down. Luckily, the plane landed safely with no injuries. KELO-TV engineers had the station back on the air in three days from the old tower in Shindler. The Rowena tower was quickly rebuilt.

On January 11, 1975, the KELO-TV tower was destroyed by a powerful winter storm. Within hours, the station was back on the air from its original site near Shindler. The tower was again rebuilt at Rowena and became operational on December 19, 1975. The Rowena site is sometimes called the "Bermuda Triangle" of tower sites due to the numerous collapses.

In the years that followed, KDLO-TV's tower collapsed and KELO-TV lost other microwave and translator sites to storms and other reasons. KPLO-TV's tower collapsed on January 22, 2010, in a severe ice storm. It returned to the air on March 19, 2010. For a time, however, it operated at low power, leaving Pierre without an over-the-air signal. The FCC subsequently issued a construction permit for a low-powered fill-in translator on channel 29 in Pierre.

On November 25, 1986, KELO-TV began broadcasting its programming in stereo. On January 12, 1996, Midcontinent Media announced that it had sold KELO-TV and its satellites to Young Broadcasting for $50 million. the sale was approved by the FCC on May 31, 1996. Midcontinent would retain the radio stations until 2004. The station celebrated its 50th anniversary on May 19, 2003.

A late-season ice storm on April 6, 1997, caused the KXJB-TV mast in Traill County, North Dakota, to collapse. As a result, several cable systems in eastern North Dakota and northwestern Minnesota were unable to receive CBS programming. Some cable systems in the area temporarily or permanently replaced KXJB-TV with KDLO-TV. (CBS programming in Eastern North Dakota has since moved to KXJB-LD and KVLY-DT2.)

In 1999, the station was given the National Association of Broadcasters Friend in Need Television Award for outstanding service in the face of natural disasters.

On June 6, 2013, Young Broadcasting announced that it would merge with Media General. The merger was approved by the FCC on November 8, after Media General shareholders approved the merger a day earlier; it was completed on November 12.

Sale to Nexstar
On January 27, 2016, Nexstar Broadcasting Group announced that it had reached an agreement to acquire Media General, including KELO-TV, with the sale being completed on January 17, 2017, bringing KELO-TV under common ownership with ABC affiliate KCAU-TV in Sioux City, Iowa.

MyUTV (DT2)
MyUTV is carried on the second digital subchannels of KELO-TV, KDLO-TV and KPLO-TV, airing in 1080i full high definition over KELO-DT2 and in 16:9 widescreen standard definition over KDLO-DT2 and KPLO-DT2. It is currently affiliated with the MyNetworkTV programming service, and also carries the regional weather channel "KELO Weather Now", primarily during the overnight hours; it is carried on cable channel 10 in most areas. It was formerly a UPN affiliate, branded simply as "My UTV", when it launched in 2004 until it affiliated with MyNetworkTV in September 2006.

MyUTV is not seen in the Rapid City market on KCLO-TV. The UPN affiliate there was KCPL-LP (channel 52), and the MyNetworkTV affiliate for Rapid City is KWBH-LD which is simulcast over KNBN-DT2 (channel 21.2; formerly KKRA-LP, channel 24); as a result, MyUTV still cannot be carried on KCLO by FCC market rules. The CW's programming (via The CW Plus) is seen on KCLO-DT2 (channel 15.2) in Rapid City.

Ever since an upgrade to their multiplexer equipment sometime in December 2019, the KDLO-TV and KPLO-TV simulcasts of MyUTV, along with the other two subchannels, have been broadcasting in a widescreen SD picture format; the subchannels were previously being offered in 480i 4:3 over KDLO-TV and KPLO-TV. Today, all subchannels are offered in the 16:9 aspect ratio on all three stations. By February 2020, the KELO-DT2 feed of MyUTV had been airing in 1080i full HD over the air, per additional distribution of digital bandwidth into channels 11.1 and 11.2 and further compression of the Ion Television and Court TV Mystery subchannels of KELO; however, the KDLO-DT2 and KPLO-DT2 feeds of MyUTV continue to be aired in the widescreen SD picture format.

News operation
Currently, KELO-TV broadcasts a total of  hours of local newscasts each week (with  hours each weekday and two hours each on Saturdays and Sundays), the highest local news output of any station in South Dakota. It is presently the only station in South Dakota carrying newscasts on weekend mornings. 

Mainly owing to being the only station in town for its first six years on the air, it has been the ratings leader in Sioux Falls for as long as records have been kept. The station's various owners have always devoted significant resources to its news operation, resulting in a higher-quality product than conventional wisdom would suggest for what has always been a small market.

KELO-TV's newscasts used Gari Communications' "The CBS Enforcer Music Collection" as its news music package since 1997 until the Nexstar purchase. Throughout its history, KELO-TV has won several Regional Emmy Awards; along with a national Emmy win in 1999 for a public service announcement for the Tradition of Caring, and two 2008 wins for "Best Mid-Size Market Newscast" for the station's weekday morning newscast KELOLAND This Morning and a feature story titled "Dominic's Wish."

On July 11, 1988, KELO-TV began using a satellite uplink truck to allow live remotes of news stories. Four years later on January 21, 1991, KELO-TV began closed captioning its local newscasts for the first time. On October 19, 2011, beginning with its 5:00 p.m. newscast, KELO-TV became the second television station in South Dakota to broadcast its local newscasts in high definition (ABC affiliate KSFY-TV began producing its newscasts in HD in August of that year), all in-studio and field segments are broadcast in the 1080i HD picture format; the station introduced a new set for its newscasts, updated its editing and control room equipment, and anchors began using iPads instead of paper scripts. Another new set debuted on February 2, 2020, on its 10:00 p.m. newscast.

Weather coverage
KELO-TV currently features five on-camera meteorologists on its staff, of which two (including chief meteorologist Dr. Jay Trobec) have earned the Certified Broadcast Meteorologist designation from the American Meteorological Society. On November 24, 1992, the station began using SkyCam systems primarily for use in weather situations. The name has since been rebranded to the KELOLAND Live Cam Network.

KELO-TV operates a network of three doppler radars across South Dakota, and covering parts of North Dakota, Minnesota and Iowa; KELO-TV is the only station in each of the markets it served to operate such a large radar network. On September 8, 1997, KELO-TV installed two live doppler weather radar units in Huron and Beresford, becoming the first station in the country to operate two doppler radars simultaneously; a third radar, located in Wall, was installed in 2001. In 2007, KELO-TV upgraded the Huron radar to use dual polarization technology and quadrupled its power to 1 million watts, it also upgraded the computer systems at the Beresford and Wall radar systems. In addition, KELO-TV rebranded its radar network as "KELOLAND Live Doppler HD".

Notable former on-air staff
 Jim Burt – sports anchor (1953–1987)
 Steve Hemmingsen – anchor
 Doug Lund – anchor; current voice over announcer

Technical information

The stations' digital signals are multiplexed:

Analog-to-digital conversion
KELO-TV began broadcasting its digital signal on March 6, 2003, becoming the first full-powered digital signal in South Dakota. The station shut down its analog signal, over VHF channel 11, on June 12, 2009, the official date in which full-power television stations in the United States transitioned from analog to digital broadcasts under federal mandate. The station's digital signal relocated from its pre-transition UHF channel 32 to VHF channel 11 for post-transition operations. KDLO-TV was originally scheduled to shut down its analog signal and broadcast in digital only on February 17, 2009, while KELO-TV, KPLO-TV and KCLO-TV's broadcasts would become digital-only effective June 12, 2009; however, the FCC rejected Young Broadcasting's petition for early termination of analog broadcasts on KDLO-TV.

Rebroadcasters

Semi-satellites

KCLO-TV

A third semi-satellite, KCLO-TV (channel 15) in Rapid City, clears all network programming as provided through its parent and simulcasts KELO-TV's newscasts (with local weather inserts), but airs a separate offering of syndicated programming; there are also separate commercial inserts and legal station identifications. Although KCLO-TV maintains a news bureau and advertising sales office on Canyon Lake Drive in Rapid City, master control and most internal operations are based at KELO-TV's studios. As Rapid City is located in the Mountain Time Zone, KCLO-TV's prime time schedule starts at 6 p.m. rather than the usual 7 p.m. start for the rest of Mountain Time, or in Central Time, where the KELOLAND Media Group's other stations are located.

Translators

Former out-of-market coverage
CSI cable in Jamestown, North Dakota, removed KELO-TV effective December 31, 2009 due to duplication of Fargo station KXJB-TV, and stalled retransmission consent negotiations.

References

External links

Skyscraperpage.com entry
Emmy Winners for PSA

CBS network affiliates
MyNetworkTV affiliates
Ion Television affiliates
Ion Mystery affiliates
Television channels and stations established in 1953
ELO-TV
Nexstar Media Group
1953 establishments in South Dakota